One Step Closer is an American straight edge melodic hardcore band from Wilkes-Barre, Pennsylvania. The band is currently signed to Run for Cover Records. The band was one of Stereogum's "Bands To Watch"  The band's debut album, This Place You know, was released in 2021 to positive reviews. BrooklynVegan calls them "one of the most exciting new bands in hardcore".

Musical style and influences
Critics have categorised the band as melodic hardcore. Upset Magazine writer Rob Mair described their music as merging "classic DC emo with youth crew passion and late 90s melodic hardcore approachability to create a sound inspired by hardcore's past but beholden to no single scene." The band often make use of elements of indie rock, post-hardcore and shoegaze.

They have cited influences including Turning Point, Inside Out, Title Fight, Blink-182, Green Day Have Heart, Bane and Mineral.

Members

Current 

 Colman O'Brien - guitar (2022-present)
 Tommy Norton - drums (2019-present); guitar (2016-2019)
 Ryan Savitski - vocals (2016-present)
 Ross Thompson - guitar

Former Members 

 Brian Talipan - bass (2016-2022)
 Grady Allen - guitar (2019-2021)
 Tom Pisano - drums (2016-2019)

Discography
Studio albums
This Place You Know (2021, Run For Cover)

EPs 

 O.S.C. Demo (2016, Silverwood Records)
 One Step Closer (2017, self-released)
 Promo (2017, self-released)
 From Me to You (2019, Triple-B Records)
 Promo 2020 (2020, Triple-B Records)
 Songs for the Willow (2023, Run For Cover Records)

References

Musical groups from Pennsylvania
Run for Cover Records artists